Gerald Drayson Adams (June 25, 1900 – August 23, 1988) was a former business executive and literary agent when he began writing for films in the 1940s.  The Oxford University-educated Adams specialized in action/adventure and western films.  His films include Dead Reckoning (1947) starring Humphrey Bogart, The Big Steal (1949), Armored Car Robbery (1950), His Kind of Woman (1951, uncredited), The Black Sleep (1956), and Kissin' Cousins (1964), starring Elvis Presley, for which he received a WGA award nomination. Adams also wrote for television series, including the pivotal episodes "Hostage" with James Garner and Jack Kelly and "Stampede" with Efrem Zimbalist Jr. for Maverick (1957) as well as "The Savage Hills" with Diane Brewster for the same series.

Filmography

Films

Television

External links
 

1900 births
1988 deaths
20th-century Canadian screenwriters